Nita Talbot (born Anita Sokol) (born August 8, 1930) is an American actress. She received an Emmy Award nomination for Best Supporting Actress in a Comedy Series for the 1967–68 season of Hogan's Heroes.

Film
Born in New York City on August 8, 1930, Talbot began her acting career appearing as a model in the 1949 film It's a Great Feeling. She was afforded a wealth of varied screen roles, from the love-starved switchboard operator in A Very Special Favor (1965) to the sharp-tongued Madame Esther in Buck and the Preacher (1972). She also appeared in such films as Bright Leaf (1950), This Could Be the Night (1957), I Married a Woman (1958), Who's Got the Action? (1962), Girl Happy (1965), The Day of the Locust (1975), Serial (1980), Chained Heat (1983), Fraternity Vacation (1985), and Puppet Master II (1991).

Television
Appearing in many TV series, Talbot was seen as Mabel Spooner opposite Larry Blyden's Joe Spooner in Joe and Mabel (1956); Iris Anderson in the 1958 Perry Mason episode "The Case of the Pint-Sized Client"; con-woman Blondie Collins in the second season of The Thin Man (1958–59); con-woman/struggling actress Susan Reed in the first-season episode "Beautiful, Blue and Deadly" of Mickey Spillane's Mike Hammer (1958–59); the immigrant wife in "Land Deal" (season 4, episode 9) on Gunsmoke (1958); and as Belle in "Belle's Back" (1960). In 1960, she also appeared in The Tab Hunter Show episode "Be My Guest."

She was in the Alfred Hitchcock Presents episode "Maria" (1961), as a circus blonde who abandons her husband to an evil dwarf woman (whose act consists of playing a monkey able to draw what it sees) who made her believe her husband had been unfaithful. She appeared with Jack Kelly in the Maverick third-season episode "Easy Mark" (1959) as a woman hired to "distract" Bart masquerading as millionaire Cornelius Van Rennselaer Jr., and played against type in the Maverick third-season episode "The Resurrection of Joe November" with James Garner (1960). She was the resourceful Girl-Friday, Dora Miles, on The Jim Backus Show (also known as Hot Off the Wire), snooty socialite Judy Evans in Here We Go Again (1973), and hypercynical Rose opposite Bill Daily in Starting from Scratch (1988).

Between 1966 and 1971, she appeared in seven episodes of Hogan's Heroes as "White Russian" spy Marya, a role for which she received a Primetime Emmy Award nomination for Best Supporting Actress in a Comedy Series in 1968 for the episode "The Hostage". Talbot was a recurring guest star on several other series, including Man Against Crime, Bourbon Street Beat (four episodes as Lusti Weather), The Secret Storm, Mannix and Supertrain, while also appearing in single episodes of other shows, including Kolchak: The Night Stalker.  Talbot also had long-running roles in Search for Tomorrow and General Hospital. On General Hospital, she portrayed Delfina from 1981 to 1983 (and again in 1992), Tiffany Hill's old friend who takes over designing Luke and Laura's wedding.

In 1971, Talbot was cast in the pilot episode of the CBS sitcom Funny Face starring actress-comedian Sandy Duncan as Sandy Stockton, a young UCLA student from Illinois majoring in education and making ends meet by working part-time as an actress in television commercials for the Prescott Advertising Agency. Talbot played Sandy's agent, Maggie Prescott. Shortly after filming the pilot, CBS picked up the program for the fall of 1971, but revised the format slightly, resulting in Talbot being dropped from the cast. She appeared in "A Stitch in Crime", episode 6 of the second season of Columbo (1973). Her last acting role was in 1997, when she voiced the character of Anastasia Hardy, the businesswoman mother of Felicia Hardy, the Black Cat, in the animated series Spider-Man.

Personal life
Talbot was married twice—first to actor Don Gordon (September 7, 1954, to April 11, 1958; divorced) and then to actor Thomas A. Geas (from August 13, 1961, until their divorce, year unknown).

Selected credits
From Hollywood.com

References

External links

1930 births
Living people
American film actresses
American stage actresses
American television actresses
Actresses from New York City
20th-century American actresses
American female models
American voice actresses
Western (genre) film actresses
Western (genre) television actors
21st-century American women